Carte Blanche is a compilation album by Algerian raï artist Rachid Taha, consisting of songs he recorded with Mohammed Amini, Mokthar Amini and Jérôme Savy when they formed a band called Carte de Séjour, along with songs from his more recent solo albums. It was released in 1997 by Barclay, and produced by Steve Hillage.

Valencia features the singing of Kirsty Hawkshaw. A video clip was made for "Ya Rayah" Taha and Bruno Maman co-wrote "Indie (1+1+1)", for which a video clip was also made.

Track listing

Charts

References

External links
Official website
Ya Rayah video clip
Indie (1+1+1) video clip

Albums produced by Steve Hillage
Rachid Taha albums
1997 compilation albums
Barclay (record label) compilation albums